The 1997 CA-TennisTrophy was a men's tennis tournament played on indoor carpet courts at the Wiener Stadthalle in Vienna, Austria and was part of the Championship Series of the 1997 ATP Tour. It was the 23rd edition of the tournament and was held from 6 October through 13 October 1997. Third-seeded Goran Ivanišević won the singles title.

Finals

Singles

 Goran Ivanišević defeated  Greg Rusedski 3–6, 6–7(4–7), 7–6(7–4), 6–2, 6–3
 It was Ivanišević's 5th title of the year and the 29th of his career.

Doubles

 Ellis Ferreira /  Patrick Galbraith defeated  Marc-Kevin Goellner /  David Prinosil 6–3, 6–4
 It was Ferreira's 4th title of the year and the 7th of his career. It was Galbraith's 4th title of the year and the 32nd of his career.

References

External links
 ATP tournament profile
 ITF tournament edition details

 
CA-TennisTrophy
Vienna Open